Realms of Chaos is a platform game written for DOS, published by Apogee Software as shareware. The game was authored by Keith Schuler, who had previously designed Paganitzu, and was originally to be a sequel entitled Alabama Smith and the Bloodfire Pendant. It is still sold by Apogee. Like previous platform Apogee games, this one utilized the FAST engine. The game was re-released in 2013 on GOG.com with support for Windows, macOS, and Linux.

Gameplay

The gameplay of Realms of Chaos was like the standard action platformer commonly found on consoles. At any time the player can switch between two siblings, a warrior called Endrick and a sorceress named Elandra, depending on which character is better suited to the particular situation. It consists of three episodes, with only the first episode playable in the shareware version.

Reception
Ole Albers from German magazine PC Joker gave it a score of 54%. A review in Power Unlimited, on the other hand, was much more positive and rewarded the game with an 8 out of 10.

References

External links
Official website

1995 video games
Apogee games
DOS games
Fantasy video games
Linux games
MacOS games
Shareware
Side-scrolling platform games
Single-player video games
Video games featuring female protagonists
Games commercially released with DOSBox
Video games developed in the United States
Video games scored by Bobby Prince
Windows games